The Athens metropolitan area may refer to:

The Athens Metropolitan area
The Athens, Georgia metropolitan area, United States

See also
Athens micropolitan area (disambiguation)
Athens (disambiguation)